The Wallis WA-116 Agile is a British autogyro developed in the early 1960s by former Royal Air Force Wing Commander Ken Wallis. The aircraft was produced in a number of variants, one of which, nicknamed Little Nellie, was flown in the 1967 James Bond film You Only Live Twice. Little Nellie is currently on static display at The Shuttleworth Collection, Old Warden, Bedfordshire in the UK.

Design and development
Wing Commander Ken Wallis, a former RAF pilot, developed a number of improvements to the autogyro design, including the offset gimbal rotor head which gives the autogyro hands-off stability. Wallis' first prototype autogyro, registered G-ARRT, was first flown on 2 August 1961.

Operational history
In 1962, five WA-116s were built by Beagle Aircraft at Shoreham, three of which were for evaluation by the British Army Air Corps. Wallis flew one of these aircraft, XR942, at that year's Farnborough Air Show.

In 1966, one of the Beagle-built WA-116s, registered G-ARZB, was modified for use in the James Bond film You Only Live Twice. Little Nellie was named after legendary music hall performer Nellie Wallace.

Few Wallis autogyros have been operated privately, with nearly all of them being used for research and demonstration flying by Wallis himself.  Wallis withdrew all his autogyros from use by anyone other than himself, after the crash of WA-117 G-AXAR at the 1970 Farnborough Air Show.

Operators

Army Air Corps

Variants
WA-116 Agile
Prototype autogyro powered by a Wallis-McCulloch 4318A engine.
WA-116-T
Two-seat variant, one built.  
WA-117 Venom
Variant powered by a  Continental O-200-B engine.  
WA-118 Meteorite
Variant powered by a  Wallis-modified Meteor Alfa supercharged two-stroke engine.  
WA-119
Variant powered by a 40 hp water-cooled 990 cc Hillman Imp engine.
WA-121
Streamlined variant for high-altitude research with a Wallis-McCulloch 4318A engine; a single WA-121 was built in 1972.

Specifications (WA-116)

See also

References

Notes

Bibliography

 Apostolo, Giorgio (1984). The Illustrated Encyclopedia of Helicopters. New York: Bonanza Books. .
 

1960s British civil utility aircraft
Single-engined pusher autogyros
Aircraft first flown in 1961